The Vancouver Maritime Museum is a maritime museum devoted to presenting the maritime history of Vancouver, British Columbia, Canada, and the Canadian Arctic. Opened in 1959 as a Vancouver centennial project, it is located within Vanier Park just west of False Creek on the Vancouver waterfront. The museum is affiliated with CMA, CHIN, and Virtual Museum of Canada.

Collection

The main exhibit is the St. Roch, a historic arctic exploration vessel used by the Royal Canadian Mounted Police. The museum also has extensive galleries of model ships, including one with historic model ships built entirely from cardboard or paper as well as a particularly fine bone model of the French warship Vengeur du Peuple which was built around 1800 by French prisoners of war, a Children's Maritime Discovery Centre, a recreation of the forecastle of Vancouver's ship Discovery, an extensive collection of maritime art, and a large library and archives. 

Outdoor displays include the NASA undersea research vessel Ben Franklin and the boiler of the Beaver, the first steamship in the Pacific Northwest; it also has a small heritage harbour. There is a workshop where visitors can watch craftsmen build models. Of particular significance is the extensive Chung collection of material relating to Canadian Pacific steamships and original hand drawn charts from Captain Cook's exploration of the Pacific. This collection is separate from the Wally Chung material housed at the Rare Books and Archives Collection at the University of British Columbia.

See also

 Maritime Museum of British Columbia
 Museum ship
 List of museum ships
 Ship replica
 Ships preserved in museums

References

External links
 

History museums in British Columbia
Maritime museums in British Columbia
Museums in Vancouver
Kitsilano